Robinsonia polyplagia is a moth in the family Erebidae. It was described by William Schaus in 1901. It is found in Venezuela and Costa Rica.

Subspecies
Robinsonia polyplagia polyplagia (Venezuela)
Robinsonia polyplagia transducens Seitz, 1921 (Costa Rica)

References

Moths described in 1901
Robinsonia (moth)
Arctiinae of South America